Tycker om dig: Svängiga låtar från förr is a 2008 studio album by Swedish band the Drifters, mostly consisting of cover versions of songs from the 1950s, 60s and 70s. The album peaked at second position at the Swedish albums chart, and in 2009 the album had sold gold.

Track listing

Personnel

Drifters
Erica Sjöström – vocals, saxophone
Ronny Nilsson – guitar
Stellan Hedevik – drums
Kent Liljefjäll – bass
Arrangement and production: Kent Liljefjäll and Martin Klaman
Mastering: Uffe Börjesson, Earhear
Photo: Thomas Harrysson
A & R: Pär Winberg

Charts

References 

2008 albums
Drifters (Swedish band) albums
Swedish-language albums